Perch Patchwork is the first official LP by experimental rock band Maps & Atlases. It was released by Barsuk Records on June 29, 2010.

Track listing

Personnel
Maps & Atlases
Erin Elders
Shiraz Dada
Chris Hainey
Dave Davison

Additional Personnel
Dan Schwartz - Vocals
Rashaad Jones - Cello
Ed Kardasz - Paintings
Justin Past - Brass, Woodwind
Josh Roth - Management
Ryan Duggan - Design
Emily Lazar - Mastering
Jason Cupp - Producer, Engineer, Mixing
Joe LaPorta - Mastering
Keith Goodwin - Vocals
Kristina Dutton - Violin
Tim Arnold - Vocals

References
http://www.artistdirect.com/nad/store/artist/album/0,,6916213,00.html

2010 albums
Maps & Atlases albums